Bani, officially the Municipality of Bani, is a 2nd class municipality in the province of Pangasinan, Philippines. According to the 2020 census, it has a population of 52,603 people.

The town, dubbed as the "Golden West" in the 1960s and early 1970s, is named after the Bani tree which could be found in the Poblacion.

History
Bani was founded on March 18, 1769 (from Zambales). In May 1903, it was transferred to Pangasinan together with the towns of Agno, Alaminos, Anda, Bolinao, Burgos, Dasol, Infanta and Mabini. San Simon, the original Bani, was transferred from Namagbagan to sitio Almacin in 1859.

The Immaculate Conception, Patron Saint of San Simon, disappeared from the church altar and discovered on top of the tall Bani tree in the vicinity of the present Church. She was brought to the Namagbagan church, and returned to the present site. Bani's name came from the Bani tree where the image of the Patroness was found. Bani (Millettia pinnata) is a smooth tree (height of 8 to 25 meters).

In 1769, Fr. Mains de Lamberto erected a "visita" in Bani with settlements around Don Cayo banks and in 1762, these settlements became a sitio, with local officials headed by Don Francisco Baltazar as "Tiniente Absolute".

On 21 November 1903 the town of Bani together with Alaminos, Bolinao, San Isidro de Potot and Infanta were annexed to Pangasinan. In 1918 the road from Alaminos to Bani was started. During the time of Martial Law the mayor of Bani was Marcelo Navarro, a member of the Liberal Party. After the People Power of 1986 the OIC who headed Bani was Edmundo Cacho

Bani is the hometown of TV host and former Pangasinan governor Oscar Orbos. From the Municipal Hall one would read that this town used to be a part of Zambales and its founders include Pangasinenses, Ilocanos and Zambals.

In May 2009, Bani along with Anda and Bolinao, was severely damaged by Typhoon Emong. The typhoon damaged an office close to the Municipal Building, the Western Pangasinan Lyceum, and a lot of structures and houses.

Geography
Bani lies between Tambac Bay and the South China Sea, and Alaminos and Bolinao. It has a land area of 19,243.6075 hectares.

Barangays
Bani is politically subdivided into 27 barangays. These barangays are headed by elected officials: Barangay Captain, Barangay Council, whose members are called Barangay Councilors. All are elected every three years.

Ambabaay
Aporao
Arwas
Ballag
Banog Norte
Banog Sur
Calabeng
Centro Toma
Colayo
Dacap Norte
Dacap Sur
Garrita
Luac
Macabit
Masidem
Poblacion
Quinaoayanan
Ranao
Ranom Iloco
San Jose
San Miguel
San Simon
San Vicente
Tiep
Tipor
Tugui Grande
Tugui Norte

Climate

Demographics

Religion

Roman Catholic population of Bani is 28,686 or 66.98% while the Philippine Independent Church (Aglipayan) population is 7,859 or 18.35%. Other churches include Bani United Methodist Church and Iglesia ni Cristo (Church of Christ) Lokal ng Bani, inter alia.

The 1762 Immaculate Conception of the Blessed Virgin Mary Parish Church (Poblacion, Bani) is under Co Pastor, Fr. Raymond Oligane and Fr. Fernando Castillo. Feast day is December 8, with its Parish Priest, Fr. Roberto Casaclang, Vicariate of the Divine Savior, Vicar Forane, Father Eduardo E. Inacay. is part of the Roman Catholic Diocese of Alaminos (Roman Catholic Archdiocese of Lingayen-Dagupan).

Economy

Government 

Bani, belonging to the first congressional district of the province of Pangasinan, is governed by a mayor designated as its local chief executive and by a municipal council as its legislative body in accordance with the Local Government Code. The mayor, vice mayor, and the councilors are elected directly by the people through an election which is being held every three years.

Spain ruled Bani from 378 from 1521 to 1899, The “pueblos”'s Gobernadorcillos were appointed by the Spanish authorities and from 1901 to 1936, the Presidentes, by the Americans. In 1937 to present, the local chief executives were elected.

The Official Seal was adopted in Resolution No. 7 on 7 March 1991.

Elected officials

Tourism
Attractions include:
1,000 step "Via Crucis" leading to the gigantic Redeemer's Cross perched on a plateau overlooking the South China Sea of Doña Segundina Enriquez Navarro, wife Mayor Marcelo C. Navarro. Annual Archdiocesan Penitential Pilgrimage every Holy Tuesday first held in 1975.
Rock formations along the shores.
Bird Watching at Bangrin Mangroves
Olanen Beach, Tobong Beach - Dacap Sur
Surip Beach in Sitio Olanen, Barangay Dacap Sur - scuba diving, snorkeling and recreational fishing of tropical fishes and lobsters
Surip Beach Mountain Resort, Hide Away Sea and Beach Resort, Cacho Beach Resor
Oldwoods by the Sea Eco Resort - Olanen
Surip Cave, Nalsoc Cave, Abot Aso Cave, Nangadiyan Cave, and the Dumaloy Cave.
Nalsoc Cave is a subterranean river with natural archway of stalactites and stalagmites, Barangay Colayo: Cave Formations (Speleothems), Dripstone, Straws, Stalactites, Stalagmites, Columns or Pillars and Shawls.
Cacho Beach Resort Bani Pangasinan
Baliwangga falls, Barangay Ranao, near Ranao Elementary School.
Bani Public Auditorium and Children's Playground
The Manuel Oboza Lara-Edralin Auditorium, Poblacion
Bani is noted for producing the sweet and juicy watermelon.

Gallery

References

External links

 
 Bani Profile at PhilAtlas.com
Municipal Profile at the National Competitiveness Council of the Philippines
Bani at the Pangasinan Government Website
Local Governance Performance Management System
 [ Philippine Standard Geographic Code]
Philippine Census Information

Municipalities of Pangasinan